Philippe Houvion (born 5 October 1957 in Briey) is a retired French pole vaulter. On 17 July 1980 in Paris, Houvion jumped 5.77 metres, beating the world record of Thierry Vigneron by two centimetres. The record only lasted until 30 July 1980, when Władysław Kozakiewicz of Poland jumped 5.78 metres in Moscow. Houvion was born in Briey, Meurthe-et-Moselle.  He was coached by his father, Maurice Houvion, after being talked out of a career in football.

International competitions

References
sports-reference

External links
Personal website 

1957 births
Living people
People from Briey
French male pole vaulters
Athletes (track and field) at the 1980 Summer Olympics
Olympic athletes of France
World record setters in athletics (track and field)
Universiade medalists in athletics (track and field)
Sportspeople from Meurthe-et-Moselle
Mediterranean Games gold medalists for France
Mediterranean Games medalists in athletics
Athletes (track and field) at the 1979 Mediterranean Games
Universiade silver medalists for France
Universiade bronze medalists for France
Medalists at the 1979 Summer Universiade
Medalists at the 1981 Summer Universiade
Competitors at the 1986 Goodwill Games
20th-century French people
21st-century French people